Tep is a Mambiloid language of Nigeria. Ethnologue considers it a dialect of Mambila, as speakers identify as Mambila, but it is a distinct language.

References 

 Blench, Roger, 2011. 'The membership and internal structure of Bantoid and the border with Bantu'. Bantu IV, Humboldt University, Berlin.

Mambiloid languages
Languages of Nigeria